Scott Mansell (born 1 October 1985) is a former British racing driver and YouTube personality.

He is not related to British Formula One champion Nigel Mansell. In June 2015, he started the Driver61 YouTube channel, presenting videos primarily about Formula 1 and  autosport in general. In July 2021, he co-founded a YouTube channel called Driven Media (now OVERDRIVE), which is primarily for experiments with cars and celebrating the engineering of unique vehicles.

Racing career 
An alumnus of Bishop Vesey's Grammar School in Sutton Coldfield, Mansell was the 2004 EuroBOSS champion. Scott was a 2004 McLaren Autosport BRDC Award nominee, losing out to eventual winner Paul di Resta. At the Brands Hatch Indy circuit, Mansell set a lap record of 38.032 seconds during the 2004 EuroBOSS season. As well as the Brands Hatch record, Mansell has also broken lap records at Silverstone, Donington Park, Lausitzring and Zolder in 2004. In the same year Mansell won the BBC Midlands Young Sportsperson of the Year as well as being nominated for the Autosport Club Driver of the Year Award.

In 2009, he was the replacement for Duncan Tappy in the Superleague Formula for Galatasaray. This was his first race since the 2006 United States Grand Prix-supporting round of the Indy Pro Series.

Racing record

American open-wheel racing
(key) (Races in bold indicate pole position)

Indy NXT

Superleague Formula results
(Races in bold indicate pole position) (Races in italics indicate fastest lap)

References

External links 
 
Driver Database information
Driver61 website
Driver61 YouTube channel

English racing drivers
1985 births
Living people
Superleague Formula drivers
Formula Ford drivers
Indy Lights drivers
Porsche Carrera Cup GB drivers
British YouTubers